Tanakia koreensis is a cyprinid found in Korea which can grow to a size of 8 centimeters.

References 

Tanakia
Fish of Korea
Taxa named by Ik-Soo Kim
Taxa named by Chi-Hong Kim
Fish described in 1990